Ibis Aircraft S.A. is a Colombian aircraft manufacturer based in Santiago de Cali. The company specializes in the design and manufacture of light aircraft in the form of ready-to-fly aircraft for the American light-sport aircraft category, and the European Fédération Aéronautique Internationale microlight category.

The company was formed on 1 November 1990 as Ultralivianos Ibis Ltda, but on 1 June 2006 changed its name to Ibis Aircraft S.A. to present a more international image.

The company produces a range of two seat high wing monoplane light sport aircraft. The Ibis GS-700 Magic has a European microlight version.

The design was commenced in 2006 and was under development in 2011.

Aircraft

References

External links

Aircraft manufacturers of Colombia
Colombian brands
Manufacturing companies established in 1990
Light-sport aircraft
Ultralight aircraft
1990 establishments in Colombia